RIPE NCC (Réseaux IP Européens Network Coordination Centre) is the regional Internet registry (RIR) for Europe, the Middle East and parts of Central Asia. Its headquarters are in Amsterdam, Netherlands, with a branch office in Dubai, UAE.

A RIR oversees the allocation and registration of Internet number resources (IPv4 addresses, IPv6 addresses and autonomous system numbers) in a specific region.

The RIPE NCC supports the technical and administrative coordination of the infrastructure of the Internet. It is a not-for-profit membership organisation with over 10,000 (as of March 2014) members located in over 76 countries in its service region.

Any individual or organisation can become a member of the RIPE NCC. The membership consists mainly of Internet service providers (ISPs), telecommunication organisations, educational institutions, governments, regulatory agencies, and large corporations.

The RIPE NCC also provides technical and administrative support to Réseaux IP Européens (RIPE), a forum open to all parties with an interest in the technical development of the Internet.

History
The RIPE NCC began its operations in April 1992 in Amsterdam, Netherlands. Initial funding was provided by the academic networks Réseaux Associés pour la Recherche Européenne (RARE) members, EARN, and EUnet. The RIPE NCC was formally established when the Dutch version of the Articles of Association was deposited with the Amsterdam Chamber of Commerce on 12 November 1997.  The first RIPE NCC Activity Plan was published in May 1991.

On 25 November 2019, RIPE NCC announced that it had made its “final /22 IPv4 allocation from the last remaining addresses in our available pool. We have now run out of IPv4 addresses.” RIPE NCC will continue to allocate IPv4 addresses, but only “from organisations that have gone out of business or are closed, or from networks that return addresses they no longer need. These addresses will be allocated to our members (LIRs) according to their position on a new waiting list ….” The announcement also called for support for the implementation of the IPv6 roll-out.

Activities
The RIPE NCC support technical coordination of the Internet infrastructure in its service region and beyond. It undertakes many activities in this area, including:
 Allocation and registration of Internet number resources (IP addresses and autonomous system numbers)
The allocation of IP addresses is important for several reasons. Public addresses need to be unique; if duplicate internet addresses  existed on a network, network traffic could be delivered to the wrong host. The RIRs make sure that public addresses are given to one organisation. The RIPE NCC does this for its own service region. Worldwide, IANA assigns blocks of addresses to the RIRs and they distribute these to end users via the LIRs (normally ISPs). Beside making sure that IP addresses and AS Numbers are only allocated to one user, the shortage of IPv4 addresses makes it important that the remaining addresses are allocated in an organised manner. For many years, the RIPE NCC has followed strict guidelines on how to assign IPv4 addresses according to policy developed by the RIPE Community, as outlined in the RIPE Document ripe-498. As the last /8 block has been assigned from IANA to all the RIRs, the RIPE NCC will only have new IPv4 addresses available for allocation for a certain amount of time.
 Development, operation and maintenance of the RIPE Database.
 Development, operation and maintenance of the RIPE Routing Registry.
 Operation of K-root, one of the world's root name servers.
 Coordination support for ENUM delegations .
 Collection and publication of neutral statistics on Internet development and performance, notable via the RIPE Atlas global measurement network and RIPEstat, a web-based interface providing information about IP address space, autonomous system numbers, and related information for hostnames and countries.

Structure

Legal

The RIPE NCC is governed by Dutch law.

Organisational
The RIPE NCC consists of:
 
 Members
 Members can directly influence the RIPE NCC’s activities and services. Members are responsible for nominating and electing candidates to the RIPE NCC executive board and for accepting the RIPE NCC charging scheme and approving the RIPE NCC financial report each year. Members also give input to, and feedback on, the activities carried out and the services provided by the RIPE NCC.

 Executive board
 RIPE NCC members nominate and elect the executive board. The board consists of between three and seven members and is responsible for appointing the RIPE NCC's managing director, for the overall financial situation of the RIPE NCC and for keeping records that allow the financial situation of the organisation to be evaluated at any time.

 RIPE NCC staff 
 Staff members perform the activities of the RIPE NCC, provide services to its members and provide administrative support to RIPE.

The RIPE NCC and RIPE
Réseaux IP Européens is a forum open to all parties with an interest in the technical development of the Internet. Although similar in name, RIPE  and the RIPE NCC are separate entities. However, they are highly interdependent. The RIPE NCC provides administrative support to RIPE, such as the facilitation of  RIPE Meetings and giving administrative support to  RIPE Working Groups.

Fees
Internet number resources do not have any monetary value. The RIPE NCC charges members an annual membership fee. Since 2012 this fee has been equal for all members and is unrelated to resource holdings. However a separate charge is made for each Provider Independent number resource associated with customers of members.

Databases

The RIPE Database
The RIPE Database is a public database containing registration details of the IP addresses and AS numbers originally allocated to members by the RIPE NCC. It shows which organisations or individuals currently hold which Internet number resources, when the allocations were made and contact details. The organisations or individuals that hold these resources are responsible for updating information in the database.

As of March 2008, the database contents are available for near real-time mirroring (NRTM).

RIPE Routing Registry
The RIPE Routing Registry (RR) is a sub-set of the RIPE Database and holds routing information in RPSL. The RIPE RR is a part of the Internet RR, a collection of databases that mirror each other. Information about domain names in the RIPE Database is for reference only. It is not the domain name registry that is run by the country code Top Level Domain (ccTLD) administrators of Europe and surrounding areas.

Service regions
The RIPE NCC service region consists of countries in Europe, the Middle East and parts of Central Asia.  RIPE NCC services are available to users outside this region through Local Internet Registries; these entities must have a valid legal address inside the service region but can offer their services to anyone.

Asia

Southwest Asia

 Bahrain

 Iran
 Iraq
 Israel
 Jordan
 Lebanon

 Oman
 Palestine
 Qatar
 Saudi Arabia
 Syria

 United Arab Emirates
 Yemen

Central Asia

 Kazakhstan
 Kyrgyzstan

 Tajikistan

 Turkmenistan

 Uzbekistan

Europe

 Albania
 Åland
 Andorra
 Armenia
 Austria
 Azerbaijan
 Belarus
 Belgium
 Bosnia-Herzegovina
 Bulgaria
 Croatia
 Cyprus
 Czech Republic
 Denmark
 Estonia
 Faroe Islands

 Finland
 France
 Georgia
 Germany
 Gibraltar (United Kingdom)
 Greece
 Hungary
 Iceland
 Ireland
 Isle of Man
 Italy
 Latvia
 Liechtenstein

 Lithuania
 Luxembourg
 Malta
 Moldova
 Monaco
 Montenegro
 Netherlands
 North Macedonia
 Norway
 Poland
 Portugal
 Romania
 Russia

 San Marino
 Serbia
 Slovakia
 Slovenia
 Spain
 Svalbard and Jan Mayen Islands
 Sweden
 Switzerland
 Turkey
 Ukraine
 United Kingdom
 Vatican City

North America
Greenland (Denmark)

Former service regions
Prior to the formation of AFRINIC, the RIPE NCC served the following countries:

 Algeria
 Benin
 Burkina Faso
 Cape Verde
 Cameroon
 Central African Republic
 Chad
 Côte d'Ivoire
 Djibouti

 Egypt
 Equatorial Guinea
 Eritrea
 Ethiopia
 Gabon
 Gambia
 Ghana
 Guinea
 Guinea-Bissau

 Kenya
 Liberia
 Libya
 Mali
 Mauritania
 Morocco
 Niger
 Nigeria
 São Tomé and Príncipe

 Senegal
 Sierra Leone
 Somalia
 Sudan
 Togo
 Tunisia
 Uganda
 Western Sahara

Related organisations and events
 Internet Corporation for Assigned Names and Numbers (ICANN)
 ICANN assigns blocks of Internet resources (IP Resources and AS Numbers) to the RIPE NCC and the other RIRs.
 Number Resource Organization (NRO)
 The  NRO is made up of the five RIRs: AfriNIC, APNIC, ARIN, LACNIC and the RIPE NCC. It carries out the joint activities of the RIRs including joint technical projects, liaison activities and policy coordination. 
 Address Supporting Organization (ASO)
 The NRO also performs the function of the ASO, one of the supporting organisations called for by the ICANN bylaws. The ASO reviews and develops recommendations on Internet Policy relating to the system of IP addressing and advises the ICANN Board on these matters. 
 World Summit on the Information Society (WSIS)
 As part of the NRO, the RIPE NCC was actively involved in the WSIS.
 Internet Governance Forum (IGF)
 As part of the NRO, the RIPE NCC is actively involved in the IGF.

References

External links
 Réseaux IP Européens (RIPE)

Information technology organizations based in Europe
Internet in Asia
Internet in Europe
Internet in the Netherlands
Organisations based in Amsterdam
Organizations established in 1992
Regional Internet registries
Working groups
1992 establishments in the Netherlands